Holly Randall Knipe (born September 5, 1978) is an English-South African American erotic photographer, director, producer, and a podcast host. In 2013, she was named one of the most influential women in the adult industry by AVN magazine.

Biography
She is the daughter of erotic photographer Suze Randall and author Humphry Knipe.  Randall was named after Hollywood Presbyterian Medical Center where she was born.

Career

Photography
Randall was 20 years old and a student at Brooks Institute of Photography in Santa Barbara, California, when her mother asked her to help her with the family-run web site Suze.net. She returned home and began shooting for Suze.net and, by 2005, her work had appeared on the covers of every major American adult magazine.

Digital
In 2004, Randall became interested in video production and started directing and producing all of the movies for Suze.net. In 2008, she launched her own production company, Holly Randall Productions, and her own membership website. In May 2013, her website joined the Met-Art network. Randall's clients include Twistys and Playboy, and she is a prolific contributor to adult magazines such as Hustler, Club, High Society, Australian Penthouse and Hot Video.

In July 2017 Randall launched the Holly Randall Unfiltered podcast.

Appearances
Randall and her mother Suze were profiled in Secret Lives of Women: Sex for Sale on the WE channel. Both have been featured on The Insider and Playboy TV's Sexcetera.

Premiering in November 2013, she has her own show on Playboy TV called Adult Film School where she hosts and directs amateurs in their own professional sex tape.

Randall appears in The Sex Factor where she performs photoshoots for the female contestants, and eventually for the winner of episode 2. Randall was also the judge on season two of DP Star, a contest where aspiring girls compete to win a big contract with Digital Playground, an adult entertainment company.

Books
Randall has four photo books, Erotic Dream Girls, Kinky Nylons, Kinky Super Beauties and Kinky Lingerie published by Goliath Books.

References

External links 

Playboy photographers
American erotic photographers
American women photographers
Artists from Los Angeles
People from Hollywood, Los Angeles
Photographers from California
1978 births
Living people
American pornographic film directors
21st-century American women
American people of South African descent
American people of English descent